Jon Belaustegui Ruano  (born 19 March 1979 in San Sebastián, Guipúzcoa) is a Spanish handball player.

He participated at the 2008 summer Olympics in Beijing as a member of the Spain men's national handball team. The team won a bronze medal, defeating Croatia.

External links
profile

1979 births
Living people
Spanish male handball players
Handball players at the 2004 Summer Olympics
Handball players at the 2008 Summer Olympics
Olympic handball players of Spain
Olympic bronze medalists for Spain
CB Ademar León players
BM Valladolid players
Olympic medalists in handball
Medalists at the 2008 Summer Olympics
Mediterranean Games gold medalists for Spain
Competitors at the 2005 Mediterranean Games
Mediterranean Games medalists in handball
Sportspeople from San Sebastián
Handball players from the Basque Country (autonomous community)
21st-century Spanish people